Ayumi Hamasaki's Arena Tour 2005 A: My Story was a nationwide tour of Japan that took place in early 2005 in order to promote her album, My Story and was released on DVD on August 24, 2005. Almost all the tracks on her My Story album were performed during the tour.

Track listing

Disc 1 (Live)
 Wonderland/Kaleidoscope (Opening)
 Happy Ending
 Inspire
 Surreal
 Unite!
 Game
 My Name's Women
 About You
 Moments
 Walking Proud
 Carols
 Honey
 Evolution
 Boys & Girls

Disc 2 (Encore)
 Step You: MC
 Humming 7/4
 Flower Garden
 Replace
 Special Screenies

Disc 3 (Special Side)
 Humming 7/4 MC
 Off-stage shots collection
 All Speeches (MC) collection

Ayumi Hamasaki video albums
2005 video albums
Live video albums
2005 live albums